Hammam Wasel (also spelled Hamam Wasil) is a town in northwestern Syria, administratively part of the Tartus Governorate, located northeast of Tartus. Nearby localities include Ayn al-Sharqiyah and al-Baydah to the west, Baniyas to the northwest, Annaza to the north, and al-Qadmus to the northeast, Masyaf to the east, Wadi al-Oyun to the southeast, al-Shaykh Badr to the south and al-Qamsiyah to the southeast. According to the Syria Central Bureau of Statistics, Hammam Wasel had a population of 1,801 in the 2004 census. It is the administrative center of the Hammam Wasel nahiyah ("sub-district") which contained 12 localities with a collective population of 8,522 in 2004. The inhabitants are predominantly Alawites.

References

Bibliography

Populated places in Baniyas District
Towns in Syria
Alawite communities in Syria